Solomon Brandon Michael Clarke Thomas-Asante (born 29 December 1998) is a British professional footballer who plays as a forward for EFL Championship club West Bromwich Albion.

Thomas-Asante began his career with Milton Keynes Dons, where he made his professional debut aged in 2016 aged 17. After spells on loan with Sutton United and Oxford City, he left Milton Keynes in 2019, spending a short spell at Ebbsfleet United before signing for Salford City. While at Salford, he won his first trophy, the 2019–20 EFL Trophy.

Club career

Milton Keynes Dons 
Thomas-Asante joined Milton Keynes Dons' academy at the age of 12, progressing through various age groups and into the club's development squad. On 6 August 2016, following an impressive pre-season, he made his debut for the first team, featuring as a substitute in the 75th minute in a 0–1 away win to Shrewsbury Town. On 12 September, Thomas-Asante signed professional terms with the club, signing a one-year deal with an option of a further year. On 5 November, he scored his first professional goal for the club, scoring in a 3–2 home FA Cup first round win over Spennymoor Town. On 2 May 2017, following an impressive first season as a professional, Thomas-Asante was awarded the club's Academy Player of the Year 2016–17. On 14 June, Thomas-Asante's contract was extended until summer 2018, and on 26 January 2018 was extended a further year until the summer of 2019.

Loans, departure, spell with Ebbsfleet United

After a brief loan spell with National League club Sutton United, Thomas-Asante joined National League South club Oxford City in late January 2019 until the end of the season, eventually going on to make 15 appearances and scoring three goals. Following limited first team opportunities during the 2018–19 season, Thomas-Asante confirmed on 11 May he would be leaving Milton Keynes following the expiry of his contract in June.

After a spell on trial with Swindon Town, Thomas-Asante signed for National League club Ebbsfleet United on 9 August 2019.

Salford City
He then signed for Salford City making his debut for the club on 3 September 2019 in a Football League Trophy match against Aston Villa Under 21's. He made his league debut for the club as a substitute on 14 September. His first goal for the club came on Boxing Day, scoring Salford's second in the 12th minute of a 3–1 victory against Crewe Alexandra. He finished the 2019-20 campaign with six goals from 26 appearances in all competitions. 

On 28 November 2020, Thomas-Asante received the first red-card of his career for a reckless foul on Newport County goalkeeper Tom King, as Salford exited the FA Cup at the second round. He scored his first goal of the season against Leicester City U-23s in the EFL Trophy group match that ended in a 3-3 draw after 90 minutes, eventually losing 8-9 on penalties in which he converted his penalty. On 19 March 2022, Thomas-Asante scored his first career hat-trick in a 5–1 home victory over Scunthorpe United.

West Bromwich Albion
On 31 August 2022, Thomas-Asante signed for EFL Championship club West Bromwich Albion on a three-year contract for a fee reported to be in the region of £300,000, rejecting a move to Birmingham City.

Personal life
Born in England, Thomas-Asante is of Ghanaian and Jamaican descent.

Career statistics

Honours
Salford City
EFL Trophy: 2019–20

Individual
Milton Keynes Dons Academy Player of the Year: 2016–17
Sky Bet Championship Goal of the month: November 2022 
Salford City Goal of the Month: October 2021, November 2021

References

External links

Living people
1998 births
English footballers
English sportspeople of Ghanaian descent
English sportspeople of Jamaican descent
Association football forwards
Milton Keynes Dons F.C. players
Sutton United F.C. players
Oxford City F.C. players
Ebbsfleet United F.C. players
Salford City F.C. players
West Bromwich Albion F.C. players
English Football League players
People from Milton Keynes
Black British sportspeople
Footballers from Buckinghamshire